North Scituate is the name of several places in the United States:

North Scituate, Massachusetts
North Scituate (MBTA station)
Smithville-North Scituate historic district in Scituate, Rhode Island